The 2012 Waterford Crystal Cup was the seventh staging of the Waterford Crystal Cup since its establishment in 2006. The draw for the 2012 fixtures took place on 3 November 2011. The championship began on 22 January 2012 and ended on 4 March 2012.

Waterford were the defending champions, however, Tipperary won the cup following a 1–21 to 2–12 defeat of Clare.

Results

Preliminary round

Quarter-finals

Semi-finals

Final

Top scorers

Season

Single game

References

Waterford
Waterford Crystal Cup